Cosmetinae is a subfamily of harvestmen in the family Cosmetidae.

Genera 
Cosmetinae currently contains 116 genera (the following list is incomplete):

 Flirtea 
 Paecilaema  
 Rhaucus 
 Taito

References

Cosmetidae
Arthropod subfamilies